Fyodor, Fedor or Feodor is the Russian form of the name "Theodore" meaning “God’s Gift”.  Fedora is the feminine form. Fyodor and Fedor are two English transliterations of the same Russian name.

It may refer to:

Given names
Fedor
Fedor Andreev (born 1982), Russian / Canadian figure skater
Fedor von Bock (1880–1945), German field marshal of World War II
Fedor Bondarchuk (born 1967), Russian film director, actor, producer, clipmaker, TV host
Fedor Emelianenko (born 1976), Russian mixed martial arts fighter
Fedor Flinzer (1832–1911), German illustrator
Fedor den Hertog (1946–2011), Dutch cyclist
Fedor Klimov (born 1990), Russian skater
Fedor Tyutin, Russian ice hockey player

Feodor
Feodor Chaliapin (1873–1938), Russian opera singer
Feodor Machnow (1878–1912), "The Russian Giant"
Feodor Vassilyev (1707–1782), whose first wife holds the record for most babies born to one woman

Fjodor
Fjodor Xhafa (born 1977), Albanian football player

Fyodor
Fyodor I of Russia (1557–1598), Tsar
Fyodor II of Russia (1605), Tsar
Fyodor III of Russia (1661–1682), Tsar
Saint Fyodor the Black, also known as Duke Theodore Rostislavich (c.1230s – d. 1298), a royal saint of the Russian Orthodox Church
Fyodor Dostoyevsky (1821–1881), Russian novelist of works including Crime and Punishment
Fyodor Glinka (1786–1880), Russian poet
Fyodor Khitruk (1917–2012), Russian animator and animation director
Fyodor Korsh, Russian entrepreneur who founded the Korsh Theatre, Moscow, in 1882
Fyodor Smolov (born 1990), Russian footballer
Fyodor Tyutchev (1803–1873), Russian poet
Fyodor Ushakov (1745–1817), Russian naval commander
Fyodor Zakharov (1919–1994), Ukrainian painter

Surnames
 Matreya Fedor (born 1997), Canadian actress
 Nicolas Fedor
, Romanian politician, member of parliament since 2020

Pseudonyms
Lennart Eriksson (born 1956), known by the nickname Fjodor, Swedish musician, bass guitarist of Swedish punk rock band Ebba Grön 
Gordon Lyon, also known by his pseudonym Fyodor Vaskovich, American network security expert and author

Other uses
 FEDOR, a humanoid robot

See also
Fyodorov

Russian masculine given names